The Forest may refer to:

Places 
The Forest (Bannisdale), a summit in the English Lake District
The Forest railway station, New South Wales, a disused Australian station
Forest Café or The Forest, a cafe and social centre in Edinburgh, Scotland

Arts and entertainment

Films 
The Forest (1982 film), an American horror directed by Donald M. Jones
The Forest (2002 film), a Portuguese film directed by Leonel Vieira
Le silence de la forêt also known as The Forest, a Central African Republican film 
The Forest (2005 film), a Cambodian horror directed by Heng Tola
The Forest (2009 film), an Indian film directed by Ashvin Kumar
The Forest (2016 American film), a horror directed by Jason Zada
The Forest (2016 Thai film), a supernatural drama directed by Paul Spurrier

Other media 
The Forest (album), a 1991 music release by David Byrne
The Forest (play), an 1871 play by Alexander Ostrovsky
The Forest (novel), a 2000 novel by Edward Rutherfurd
The Forest (TV series), a 2017 French crime drama
The Forest (video game), a 2018 survival horror game
Sons of the Forest, 2023 video game sequel to The Forest

See also 
Forest (disambiguation)
Forest District (disambiguation)